The 2001–02 Greek Basket League season was the 62nd season of the Greek Basket League, the highest tier professional basketball league in Greece. It was also the 10th season of Greek Basket League championship that was regulated by HEBA (ESAKE). The winner of the league was AEK Athens, which beat Olympiacos in the league's playoff's finals. The clubs Dafni and KAOD were relegated to the Greek A2 League. The top scorer of the league was Nikos Chatzivrettas, a player of Iraklis. Dimos Dikoudis, player of AEK Athens, was named the MVP of the league.

Teams

Regular season

Source:   esake.gr, galanissportsdata.com

Playoffs

Positions 1-6

Positions 7-12

The finals

Final standings

Top Players

References

External links
 Official HEBA Site
 Official Hellenic Basketball Federation Site
   HEBA Site, season 2001/02
  Galanis Sports Data

Greek Basket League seasons
1
Greek